2018 inter-Korean summit may refer to:
 April 2018 inter-Korean summit
 May 2018 inter-Korean summit
 September 2018 inter-Korean summit

See also
 Inter-Korean summits